The European Women's Gymnastics Championships are an artistic  championships for female gymnasts from European countries organised by the European Union of Gymnastics. They are held annually, though rotate between two different formats.

History 
Originally held biannually in odd-numbered years, the championships moved to even-numbered years in 1990. In 2005 a second set of championships was introduced, titled the "individual championships". Although numbered as a separate event, winners in either event are considered European champions, and the championships as a result have in effect become an annual event, but in two formats: in even-numbered years, a stand-alone women's event incorporates the European Junior Artistic Gymnastics championships (an entirely separate men's competition is held in the same years, although occasionally at the same venue), while in odd-numbered years, the separately numbered 'individual championships' are held in conjunction with the men's competition of the same description, but without juniors, as a single event.

As a result, there is no individual all-around title awarded in even-numbered years (except for juniors), and similarly no team all-around title awarded in odd-numbered years. Otherwise the apparatus and titles are identical. In effect, the juniors championships remain biannual. In 2022, as part of the multisport 2022 European Championships in Munich, an individual all-around title was introduced in an unusual format, combined with both team and apparatus qualification.

A further event, the European Games also holds a full set of championships for European artistic gymnasts in the year preceding the Summer Olympic Games, having begun in 2015. These, however, are organized by the European Olympic Committees and are not recognized as part of the continuity of the European Championships.

Championships 
2018 and 2022 part of the European Championships (Multi-Sport). Juniors from 1978 to 1992 was held in other country and from 1994 along with seniors.

Juniors

Seniors and Juniors

Medal table

Seniors 
As of 2022.

Juniors

See also
 European Artistic Gymnastics Championships – Women's individual all-around
 European Men's and Women's Artistic Gymnastics Individual Championships
 European Men's Artistic Gymnastics Championships
 World Artistic Gymnastics Championships

Notes

Results

References

 
Recurring sporting events established in 1957
Women's sports competitions in Europe